Big Bertha (born Ashley Crawford, legally changed to Bertha Crawford) is a superhero appearing in American comic books published by Marvel Comics. Created by John Byrne, the character first appeared in West Coast Avengers vol. 2 #46 (July 1989).

Publication history
Created by John Byrne, she first appeared in West Coast Avengers vol. 2 #46 (July 1989).

Fictional character biography
Not a lot is known of Bertha's life before she responded to Mr. Immortal's advertisement for a hero team, the team who would become the Great Lakes Avengers. It was revealed in the G.L.A. mini-series that Ashley is in fact a mutant.

When not using her powers, Ashley is a proverbial 'big fish in a small pond', being the most famous fashion model in Milwaukee, Wisconsin, her hometown. Although offers have come her way numerous times for more prospective opportunities, she has declined them all, choosing to stay in Milwaukee with the team she considers family.

She was seen in public with the team by Hawkeye and Mockingbird, who later agreed to become their mentors.  With the team, she helped Hawkeye and the West Coast Avengers against "That Which Endures." They also assisted Mockingbird in a holding action against Terminus. After aiding the Thunderbolts against the villain Graviton, the team clashed with the mercenary Deadpool.

GLA: Misassembled
During the G.L.A. mini-series, the team took on Maelstrom who was trying to destroy the universe. After Dinah Soar's death, Big Bertha began to think of quitting the team to focus on her modeling career but decided to stay. She later captures Leather Boy, a rejected GLA member, who had infiltrated the team's headquarters disguised as Doctor Doom and killed Mr. Immortal and Monkey Joe, Squirrel Girl's sidekick. During the final battle, she tried to save Flatman from being sucked into a vortex made from the device that Maelstrom created to achieve universal destruction. Fortunately, it turned out that only his clothes had been sucked off and he was merely standing at an extreme angle so he wouldn't be seen naked. After their victory, they returned to their headquarters only to find that Tony Stark had sent a cease and desist notice ordering them to stop using the Avengers name. After discovering that they were all mutants, the team changed their name to the Great Lakes X-Men, complete with new costumes.

GLX-Mas Special
During the GLX-Mas Special, the team confronted Dr. Tannenbaum, who had released an army of living Christmas trees on the citizens of Wisconsin.

Great Lakes Champions
The team participated in a charity superhero poker tournament hosted by the Thing, where Flatman beat their host in the final round. Flatman's status as champion inspired the team to rename themselves the Great Lakes Champions, after being discouraged from affiliation with both the X-Men and the Defenders by members of those teams present at the tournament, ignoring the protests of former Champions of Los Angeles member Hercules.

Civil War/The Initiative

All of the Great Lakes Champions registered with the United States government as required by the Superhuman Registration Act, as revealed when Deadpool mistakenly attempted to apprehend them for violating the Act, only to be defeated and informed that they had already registered.

Big Bertha has been identified as one of the 142 registered superheroes who are part of the Initiative.

Big Bertha and her teammates became the Initiative group in charge of Wisconsin, calling themselves the Great Lakes Initiative. They were given a rescue mission to save Dionysus after he fell from Mount Olympus and was captured by A.I.M., who planned to use his powers to cause mental instability on all the superheroes they consider a threat. During the task, Deadpool ambushes Mr. Immortal and Flatman. Flatman recruited him as a reserve member of the team but the mercenary eventually overstayed his welcome. In an attempt to evict Deadpool from their Initiative-sponsored headquarters, Big Bertha agrees on one date. Confusion reigns as she appears for the date in her slim form. After saving lives in a dockside all-you-can-eat restaurant, Bertha realizes that Deadpool was only attracted to her large form. She lectures him, telling of her experiences of only being valued for her looks in her slim form. In response, Deadpool removes his mask revealing his cancer-scarred face. Bertha promptly vomits in the parking lot, much to Deadpool's chagrin. Later, Squirrel Girl manages to evict Deadpool.

Secret Invasion
During the Secret Invasion storyline, the team confronted a Skrull disguised as Grasshopper, with help from Gravity and Catwalk. While Mr. Immortal was shocked at the discovery, Big Bertha thought that it was ridiculously obvious. They later appeared to welcome Gravity as leader of the team, after he was transferred to Wisconsin by Norman Osborn.

Fear Itself
During the Fear Itself storyline, the team confronts Asbestos Man, who takes advantage of the fear and chaos that is happening. None of the group actually wish to touch the man due to the toxicity of his suit. Mr. Immortal talks him into giving up in return for being remembered by the others.

Great Lakes Avengers (2016 series)
In the ongoing series The Great Lakes Avengers, it is revealed that the team had disbanded and gone their separate ways. Ashley had changed her name legally to Bertha for a more consistent personal brand and officially became a plus size model. She then meets Flatman and Doorman at a diner, after being informed that the GLA has been reinstated as a permanent addition to the Avengers. They relocate to Detroit, Michigan where they meet a girl named Pansy at their new headquarters, a factory owned by Tony Stark. The team then goes to a local bar to try to convince the owner to turn down the music. The owner, named Nain Rogue, instead refuses and begins to insult them, particularly Mr. Immortal and Bertha. Upon getting arrested after a fight, Doorman escapes leaving Flatman and Bertha to deal with a young girl named Goodness Silva who can transform into a werewolf and was attacking the police inside the station. They are later released thanks to Connie Ferrari, despite the accusations of councilman Dick Snerd, who is actually Nain Rouge. Big Bertha was present when Goodness Silva was added to the Great Lakes Avengers where she takes on the name of Good Boy. After the team discovers that Dick Snerd shut them down, Mr. Immortal returns. Bertha exits angrily and takes Doorman and Good Boy to Nain Rogue's bar to find clues. It is later revealed that Mr. Immortal and Bertha dated but broke up due to Mr. Immortal's drinking problems. After Doorman mysteriously disappears upon entering the bar, Bertha and Good Boy discover that Dick Snerd is Nain Rogue, after finding him drunk in his office. Bertha and Good Boy take a drunken Snerd hostage and hear his backstory, or at least partially some of it. Realizing that Snerd has numerous connections and would potentially get back on the streets, Good Boy transforms and brutally assaults Snerd just as Ferrari sees the aftermath of the carnage she inflicted upon him. Later, the team drop off a gravely injured Snerd at the hospital.

After Connie tells the team to lie low for a couple of days, Bertha goes to a modeling gig for a weight-loss product created by Dr. Nod. She then discovers that the gig was a trap set up by Dr. Nod to get a sample of her mutant DNA and use it to improve his product with Bertha's powers. Bertha fights back, but Dr. Nod ingests much of the supplements, becoming a huge monster, and injures her. Bertha sends a text to the rest of her teammates, including Good Boy, and takes some of the supplements herself to fight Dr. Nod. During the battle, Dr. Nod takes more of the supplements, becoming much bigger and monstrous. On Mr. Immortal's suggestion, the team performs a maneuver that has Doorman and Mr. Immortal get inside Dr. Nod's body, where Mr. Immortal manages to kill him by punching his heart. After their victory, the team is visited by Deadpool who tells them that they've been fired and can no longer use the Avengers name, leaving them confused.

Powers and abilities
Big Bertha has the ability to alter her own body's fat contents at will. In this form, she possesses immeasurable strength and durability, as well as being bulletproof. Bertha suggested that these capabilities are actually based on the manipulation of body mass, so she can selectively increase fatty tissues in those specific anatomical parts to control their size. She is able to leap great distances, purge the excess fat from her body through induced vomiting, and retain a slim figure. 

In addition to her mutant powers, she is also a wealthy supermodel, formidable unarmed combatant, <ref>West Coast Avengers Annual Vol 2 #6 (June 1991)</ref> skilled aircraft pilot, and proficient card player.

 Reception 

 Accolades 

 In 2019, CBR.com ranked Big Bertha 4th in their "Marvel: 10 Most Powerful Members Of The Great Lakes Avengers" list.
 In 2020, Scary Mommy included Big Bertha in their "Looking For A Role Model? These 195+ Marvel Female Characters Are Truly Heroic" list.
 In 2020, CBR.com ranked Big Bertha 2nd in their "Great Lakes Avengers: Every Member" list and 7th in their "Avengers: The 10 Most Powerful Recruits From The Fifty State Initiative" list.

Alternate versions
Ultimate Marvel
Big Bertha briefly appears in Ultimate X-Men as a Coney Island freak show attraction.

Deadpool MAX
In this version, Big Bertha is a prostitute who Deadpool hires for Bob's bachelor party, despite the fact he is not getting married. Bertha claims she does not work for a pimp because "they promote rude behavior", and ends up getting involved in Deadpool and Bob's latest misadventure when other prostitutes begin gunning after them. It's revealed that Weasel was a rival pimp who was trying to off Bertha for stealing their business. In the end Deadpool defeats Weasel and the prostitutes, but leaves Bertha to comically quarrel with another prostitute who was mocking her weight. Later on, Weasel tricks Bertha into coming to his unlicensed medical clinic while setting Bob up under the pretense of giving him plastic surgery to avoid the authorities, as he has become the most wanted fugitive in the United States for the Cincinnati Liquid X incident; what he actually does is transfer Bertha's fat to Bob, in the hopes of ruining both their lives. Bertha, however, maintains her clientele, leaving Weasel humiliated.

In other media

Television
 Big Bertha makes a cameo appearance in the Wolverine and the X-Men'' episode "Greetings From Genosha."

References

External links
 Big Bertha at Marvel.com

Avengers (comics) characters
Characters created by John Byrne (comics)
Comics characters introduced in 1989
Female characters in comics
Fictional aviators
Fictional characters from Milwaukee
Fictional characters who can change size
Fictional characters with superhuman durability or invulnerability
Fictional models
Marvel Comics characters with superhuman strength
Marvel Comics female superheroes
Marvel Comics mutants
Marvel Comics superheroes